Valeria Bianchi (born 16 September 1985) is an Argentine handball player. She defends Argentina, such as at the 2011 World Women's Handball Championship in Brazil.

References

External links

1985 births
Living people
Argentine female handball players
Argentine people of Italian descent
Handball players at the 2011 Pan American Games
Handball players at the 2015 Pan American Games
Pan American Games silver medalists for Argentina
Pan American Games medalists in handball
Medalists at the 2015 Pan American Games
Medalists at the 2011 Pan American Games